Baron Jean-Louis de Cartier de Marchienne is a Belgian businessman and farmer. He is a member of the board and managing director of Carta Mundi, the world leader in the production of playing cards.

Between 1984 and 1991 he was involved in the establishment of several agricultural companies in Belgium with branches in Hungary and the Netherlands. In 1992 he became a member of the board of directors of publishing house Brepols in Turnhout, where his father was also a board member. In 1995 he became chairman of the board of directors of Brepols and its subsidiaries. In 1998 he became chairman of Cartamundi, a card game producer also based in Turnhout and of which the de Cartier family is a shareholder.

See also
 Emile de Cartier de Marchienne
 Louis de Cartier de Marchienne

References

Sources
 Carta Mundi

External links
 Cartier Castle

Barons of Belgium
Barons of Cartier de Marchienne
Belgian businesspeople
Belgian farmers
Living people
Year of birth missing (living people)